Iranarpia is a genus of moths of the family Crambidae.

Species
Iranarpia albalis (Amsel, 1961)
Iranarpia silacealis (Amsel, 1951)

References

Scopariinae
Crambidae genera